The Order of the Golden and Rosy Cross (Orden des Gold- und Rosenkreutz, also the Fraternity of the Golden and Rosy Cross) was a German Rosicrucian organization founded in the 1750s by Freemason and alchemist Hermann Fictuld. Candidates were expected to be Master Masons in good standing. Alchemy was to be a central study for members. Much of the hierarchical structure for this order was used in Societas Rosicruciana in Anglia (SRIA) and from there, the Hermetic Order of the Golden Dawn.

History

The fraternity was founded in the 1750s, but it is not certain when it came into existence. Many documents and books mention it from the eighteenth century.  For instance, Frater U∴D∴ believes that in 1710, the idea for the order was born with the publication of Sigmund Richter's (using the name Sincerus Renatus) The perfect and true preparation of the Philosophers Stone according to the secret of the Brotherhoods of the Golden and Rosy Cross. 
By the 1770s, the order had centers in Berlin, Hamburg, Frankfurt am Main, Regensburg, Munich, Vienna, Prague, Poland, Hungary, and Russia.

The order slowly began to decline after the death of King William II.

Structure and governance

The order is subdivided into:
Grade I    -  Juniorus
Grade II   -  Theoricus
Grade III  -  Practicus
Grade IV   -  Philosophus
Grade V    -  Adeptus Minor
Grade VI   -  Adeptus Major
Grade VII  -  Adeptus Exemptus
Grade VIII -  Magister
Grade IX   -  Magus

Known members
King Friedrich Wilhelm
Georg Forster
Johann Christoph von Wöllner
Nikolay Novikov
J.C.A. Theden
Ivan Lopukhin
Ivan Dmitrevsky

References

Bibliography
 Raffaella Faggionato: "Rosicrucian Utopia in Eighteenth-Century Russia, A: The Masonic Circle of N.I. Novikov". 
 Antoine Faivre: "Access to Western esotericism", State University of New York Press, 1994, 
 Christopher McIntosh: "The Rosicrucians: the history, mythology, and rituals of an esoteric order", Weiser Books 1988, 
 McIntosh, Christopher (1992) The Rose Cross and the Age of Reason: Eighteenth-century Rosicrucianism in Central Europe and its relationship to the Enlightenment, E.J. Brill, New York, 
 Claude-Antoine Thory: Acta Latomorum, ou chronoligie de l'histoire de la franche-maçonnerie Française et étrangère avec un supplément, Durfart, Paris, 2 bind, 1815
 Renko D. Geffarth (2007) "Religion Und Arkane Hierarchie: Der Orden Der Gold- Und Rosenkreuzer Als Geheime Kirche Im 18. Jahrhundert",  
 Harald Lamprecht: Neue Rosenkreuzer. Ein Handbuch. Vandenhoeck & Ruprecht
 Karl R.H. Frick: "Die Erleuchteten: Gnostisch-theosophische und alchemistisch-rosenkreuzerische Geheimgesellschaften bis zum Ende des 18. Jahrhunderts, ein Beitrag zur Geistesgeschichte der Neuzeit", Akademische Druck- und Verlagsanstalt, Graz, 1973, ; andre utgave Marix Verlag, 31. januar 2005, 

1750s establishments in the Holy Roman Empire
Fraternal orders
Rosicrucian organizations